The Ladies Finnish Masters was a women's professional golf tournament on the Ladies European Tour held in Helsinki, Finland, between 2005 and 2011. In 2006 Finnair, the country's largest airline, became title sponsor and it changed name to the Finnair Masters. The 54-hole tournament was played every year at the Helsinki Golf Club and with a purse of €200,000 had one of the smaller prize funds on the tour.

Between 2005 and 2007 the tournament was a constituent of the Volvo Cross Country Challenge, which offered a bonus pool of $100,000 for events in the Nordic region, with the added bonus of $1million should any player win all four of the Volvo Cross Country Challenge events.

Winners

See also
Ladies Finnish Open

References

External links

Ladies European Tour

Former Ladies European Tour events
Golf tournaments in Finland